Yelimunnoli is a village in Belagavi district in the Indian state of Karnataka. It is a Zilla Panchayat constituency.

Geography
It is 4 km from Hukkeri and 54 km south of Belgaum. The nearest river is Hiranyakesi.

Transport 
The nearest airport is Belgaum, 54 km away. The nearest railway stations are Ghataprabha (20 km), Belgaum (54 km), Ghat prabha (22 km),

Places to visit 
Nearby picnic spots include Gokak falls, Hidkal Dam and Gudachana Malaki falls.

References

Villages in Belagavi district